Trichoniscidae are a family of isopods (woodlice), including the most abundant British woodlouse, Trichoniscus pusillus. Most species of woodlice that have returned to an aquatic or amphibian way of life belong to this family. Several species from the following genera live in water and on land: Titanethes, Cyphonetes, Alpioniscus, Scotoniscus, Bureschia, Brackenridgia, Mexiconiscus, Trichoniscoides, Cretoniscellus, Balearonethes and Cyphoniscellus.

Genera
The family Trichoniscidae contains the following genera, including those previously treated as the separate family Buddelundiellidae:

References

Woodlice
Crustacean families